The Essential Michael Nyman Band is a studio album featuring a collection of music by Michael Nyman written for the films of Peter Greenaway and newly performed by the Michael Nyman Band.  It is the seventeenth album release by Nyman.  The album features liner notes by Annette Morreau, who describes the album as "a summation and digest of ten years of progress in the performance of music by a composer -- a composer with whom, so evidently, a group of friends and expert musicians intimately identify their total commitment, virtuosity, and joyous enthusiasm."

As the works on the album were written as concert pieces before being transmuted into film music, some of the selections, particularly "Chasing Sheep Is Best Left to Shepherds" contain more material than their film versions, and some are very different in style, such as "An Eye for Optical Theory", with a tempo more than double from its original in The Draughtsman's Contract.  The other films from which the music is derived are A Zed & Two Noughts (where it was originally not performed by the Michael Nyman Band), Drowning By Numbers, The Cook The Thief His Wife & Her Lover, Making a Splash, and Prospero's Books.

Nyman created a similar album in 2005 with The Composer's Cut Series Vol. II: Nyman/Greenaway Revisited.  Fan reaction has generally been that The Essential Michael Nyman Band is the superior album.

Track listing
Chasing sheep is best left to shepherds
An eye for optical theory
The garden is becoming a robe room
Prawn watching
Time lapse
Fish Beach
Wheelbarrow Walk
Knowing the Ropes
Miserere paraphrase
Memorial
StrokingSynchronizing
Miranda

Tracks 1-3 from The Draughtsman's Contract. Tracks 4-5 from A Zed and Two Noughts. Tracks 6-8 from Drowning by Numbers. Tracks 9-10 from The Cook, The Thief, His Wife and Her Lover. Track 11 from Making a Splash. Track 12 from Prospero's Books.
"Stroking" is not the same piece that was known as "Stroking" on, The Kiss and Other Movements, but rather, "Gliding."

An Eye for Optical Theory
Track 2, An Eye for Optical Theory, is based on a four-bar harmonic frame likely originally composed by William Croft. Nyman employs the syncopated potential of the original by adding the two saxophones to layer textures consisting of individual ‘collections’ of melodies over a constantly-changing backing track in the remaining ensemble. This gives rise to a strident melodic line in the upper strings.

Personnel
Alexander Balanescu, Clare Connors, Ann Morphy, violin
Kate Musker, viola
Tony Hinnigan, Justin Pearson, cello
Martin Elliott, bass guitar
John Harle, David Roach, soprano & alto saxophone
Andrew Findon, baritone saxophone, flute, piccolo
Steve Sidwell, trumpet
Marjorie Dunn, horn
Nigel Barr, bass trombone, euphonium
John Lenehan, piano
Michael Nyman, piano (tracks 1, 2, 3, 11, 12)
Sarah Leonard, soprano (tracks 9, 10, 12)
Linda Hirst, mezzo-soprano (track 12)
Photographs courtesy of the Tokyo Globe Theatre

This recording made at the JVC Victor Studios, Tokyo
Engineer: Michael J. Dutton
Mixed at Kitsch Studio, Brussels
Edited by Michael J. Dutton at Abbey Road Studios, London
Publishers: Chester Music Ltd/Kelly Music Ltd; EG Music Ltd (track 11)
Art direction: David Smart
Cover design by Russell Warren-Fisher from a photo by Steve Pyke

References

1992 albums
Michael Nyman albums